Valentin Alekseevich Zhukovski (May 6, 1858 – January 17, 1918) (Russian: Жуковский, Валентин Алексеевич) was a famous Russian orientalist, who wrote many books and articles on the subject. His research of Persian literature, history, grammar, particularly the Qajar era was a seminal work.

Sources
 

Russian orientalists
1858 births
1918 deaths